The colón (plural: colones; sign: ₡; code: CRC) is the currency of Costa Rica. It was named after Christopher Columbus, known as Cristóbal Colón in Spanish. A colón is divided into one hundred céntimos.

Symbol 
The symbol for the im sad capital letter "C" help strokes.

Nonetheless, the commonly available cent symbol '¢' is frequently used locally to designate the colón in price markings and advertisements.

History
The colón was introduced in 1896, replacing the Costa Rican peso at par. The colón is divided into 100 centimos, although, between 1917 and 1919, coins were issued using the name centavo for the 1/100 subunit of the colón. Colones were issued by a variety of banks in the first half of the twentieth century, but since 1951 have been produced solely by the Central Bank of Costa Rica. The currency was subject to a crawling peg against the United States dollar from 2006 to 2015, but has been floating within a band allowed by the Costa Rican central bank since then.

Coins

First coins, 1897–1917

Because the colón replaced the peso at par, there was no immediate need for new coins in 1896. In 1897, gold 2, 5, 10 and 20 colones were  issued, followed by silver 50 centimos, and followed by cupro-nickel 2 centimos in 1903 and silver 5 and 10 centimos in 1905. The 5 and 10 centimos bore the initials G.C.R., indicating that they were issues of the government.

Centavo issues, 1917–1919
In 1917, coins were issued in denominations of 5 and 10 centavos rather than centimos. 50 centavo coins were minted but not issued (see below). All bore the G.C.R. initials.

Government issues, 1920–1941
The issuance of centimo coins by the government (still indicated by the initials G.C.R.) was resumed in 1920, with 5 and 10 centimos issued. In 1923, silver 25 and 50 centimos from the peso currency, along with the unissued 50 centavos from 1917 and 1918, were issued with counterstamps which doubled their values to 50 centimos and 1 colón.

In 1925, silver 25 centimo coins were introduced. The last government issued coins were brass 10 centimos issued between 1936 and 1941.

Banco Internacional issues, 1935
In 1935, the International Bank of Costa Rica issued cupro-nickel coins in denominations of 25 and 50 centimos and 1 colón. These bore the initials B.I.C.R.

Banco Nacional issues, 1937–1948
In 1937, the National Bank introduced coins in denominations of 25 and 50 centimos and 1 colón which bore the initials B.N.C.R. These were followed by 5 and 10 centimos in 1942 and 2 colones in 1948.

Banco Central issues, 1951–present
In 1951, the Central Bank took over coin issuance using the initials B.C.C.R. while introducing 5 and 10 centimo coins. These were followed by 1 and 2 colones in 1954, 50 centimos in 1965 and 25 centimos in 1967. In 1982–1983, 5 and 10 centimo coins were discontinued, the sizes of the 25 centimo to 2 colón coins were reduced and 5, 10 and 20 colón coins were introduced. Between 1995 & 1998, smaller, brass 1, 5 and 10 colón coins were introduced and coins for 25, 50 & 100 colones were added. 500 colones followed in 2003. Aluminium 5 and 10 colones were introduced in 2006. Coins of 1 colón are no longer found in circulation. In 2009 the larger, silver-coloured  ₡5,  ₡10 &  ₡20 were gradually withdrawn leaving the small, lighter,  ₡5 and ₡10 and the gold-coloured  ₡5,  ₡10,  ₡25,  ₡50,  ₡100 &  ₡500 coins circulating. At the end of 2019, the ₡5 coin was phased out.

In 2021, a smaller bimetallic ₡500 coin was introduced to commemorate the bicentennial of Costa Rican independence.

Banknotes

Private bank issues, 1896–1914
Four private banks, the Banco Anglo–Costarricense, the Banco Comercial de Costa Rica, the Banco de Costa Rica and the Banco Mercantil de Costa Rica, issued notes between 1864 and 1917.

The Banco Anglo–Costarricense was established in 1864 and issued notes from 1864 to 1917. It later became a state-owned bank and in 1994 went bankrupt and closed. Notes were issued in denominations of 1, 25, 50, and 100 pesos as well as 5, 10, 20, 50, and 100 colones. Some 1, 5, 10 and 20 colones notes (unsigned and undated) were released in 1963 when the bank celebrated its 100th anniversary. Some had Muestra sin Valor ("sample without value") printed on them in order to nullify the legal tender status and to prevent people from selling them. Most, however, didn't have that printed on them, which makes it harder nowadays to find notes with the seal.

The Banco de Costa Rica was established in 1890 and issued notes from 1890 to 1914. It is currently a state-owned bank. Notes were issued in denominations of 1, 2, 5, 10, 20, and 100 pesos as well as 5, 10, 20, 50 and 100 colones.

The Banco Comercial de Costa Rica issued notes between 1906 and 1914 in denominations of 5, 10, 20, 50 and 100 colones.

The Banco Mercantil de Costa Rica issued notes between 1910 and 1916, also in denominations of 5, 10, 20, 50 and 100 colones.

Government issues, 1897–1917
The government issued gold certificates in 1897 for 5, 10, 25, 50 and 100 colones. Between 1902 and 1917, it issued silver certificates for 50 centimos, 1, 2, 50 and 100 colones.

Banco Internacional, 1914–1936
In 1914, the Banco Internacional de Costa Rica introduced notes in denominations of 5, 10, 20, 50 and 100 colones, to which 25 and 50 centimos, 1 and 2 colones were added in 1918. Although 25 centimos were not issued after 1919, the other denominations continued to be issued until 1936. After 1917, the Banco Internacional's notes were the only issued for circulation.

Banco Nacional, 1937–1949
In 1937, the Banco Nacional de Costa Rica took over paper money issuing and issued notes for 1, 2, 5, 10, 20, 50 and 100 colones until 1949. Many of the early notes were provisional issues overprinted on notes of the Banco Internacional, including the 1 colón notes which were briefly issued.

Banco Central, 1950– 
The Banco Central de Costa Rica began issuing paper money in 1950, with notes for 5, 10, 20, 50 and 100 colones. The first notes were provisional issues produced from Banco Nacional notes (unsigned and undated). The Central Bank printed on them the corresponding signatures and dates, and the legend "BANCO CENTRAL DE COSTA RICA" over "BANCO NACIONAL DE COSTA RICA". Regular issues of notes began in 1951, but a second provisional issue of 2 colones notes was made in 1967. 1,000 colones notes were added in 1958, followed by 500 colones in 1973, 5,000 colones in 1992, 2,000 and 10,000 colones in 1997, and 20000 and 50000 colones in 2011.

Whenever a banknote of a specific denomination is changed (design, security features, colour, etc.), a new series is released. Prior to the most recent series, every banknote issued by this bank measures approximately 6.7 cm x 15.6 cm. Every note also has the serial and series numbers printed in red ink. Exceptions occurred with:
 2 colones provisional issue: black
 5 colones provisional issue: orange
 10 colones provisional issue: blue
 500 colones series B: black
 1,000 colones series A issue: dark blue

Every issue also features the signatures, date, and the agreement number printed in black.

Banknote reform
In 2011 and 2012, Costa Rican banknotes underwent a reform and were replaced by a new series, with each banknote a different color and size. Two new denominations were introduced as part of the reform; 20,000 and 50,000 colones. The old notes are redeemable at the Central Bank of Costa Rica, but have been replaced with the newer models.

In 2020 and 2021, a new series of banknotes was issued in polymer, conserving the same themes of the 2011 series but with slightly redesigned motifs, with the old notes withdrawn in 2022. A redesigned 50000-colón note was not included in the new series, but existing issues remain legal tender.

Exchange rate 
The colón has had an unusual relationship with the U.S. dollar that may best be described as a "crawling peg"; instead of being defined by a constant value to the dollar, the colón instead would grow progressively weaker at a fixed rate of about 3.294 colones per dollar per month. On October 16, 2006, however, this crawling peg was modified due to weakness in the U.S. dollar and the perception that the colón was undervalued.

Since October 17, 2006, the colón is no longer bound to controlled devaluations (known in Costa Rica as minidevaluaciones) by the Central Bank of Costa Rica. With the new system, sistema cambiario de bandas, the exchange rates posted by the Central Bank are a "reference" and each authorized financial institution can determine their value independently in hopes that the free market will provide a mechanism to keep them reasonable.

The exchange rate is now free to float within a currency band referenced to the United States dollar.  The floor of the band has been set at a fixed value, while the ceiling changes at a fixed rate.  In practice the exchange rate has remained fixed at the lower value of the currency band.

Nicknames
The colón is sometimes referred to as the peso, which was the name of the Costa Rican currency before the colón, until 1896. This is very common across Hispanic American countries, where most have (or had at some point) currencies called pesos. Another slang name is caña (Spanish for sugar cane, plural cañas) but this term is more often used in its plural form and for amounts under 100 colones with multiples of ten, except for 5; e.g., 5 cañas, 10 cañas, 20 cañas, etc. This term has become less common.

Teja (roof tile) is the slang term for one hundred colones, so that five hundred colones coins and notes are called "cinco tejas", while fifty colones coins and notes are referred to as "media teja" (half roof tile).

The former five hundred colones note was called "morado" (purple) because of its colour, but it is no longer in circulation.

The one thousand colones note is called "un rojo" (one red) because of its colour. This also applies for any amounts that are multiples of a thousand colones (e.g., twenty thousand colones = veinte rojos).

The five thousand colones note is called tucán (toucan), referring to the image of a toucan it once carried (it now features a monkey). It can also be called "una libra" (one pound), although this term is no longer in common use.

The ten thousand colones note is also known as un puma, referring to the puma shown on one of its faces of a previous version.

See also
 Economy of Costa Rica
 Commemorative coins of Costa Rica
 Commemorative banknotes of Costa Rica

References

External links
  Official site of Banco Central de Costa Rica
 The Museum of the Central Bank of Costa Rica
 cambiodeldolar.com-Alternative up to date information about the exchange rate of the Costa Rican Colón to the United States Dollar.

 Current and historic banknotes of Costa Rica
 Coins of Costa Rica

Currencies of Costa Rica
Currencies introduced in 1896
Currency symbols